The Eagle DW.1 is an American-built single-seat agricultural biplane of the late 1970s.

Development

The DW.1 was designed by Dean Wilson of the Eagle Aircraft Company of Boise, Idaho and the first example first flew in 1977.  The Eagle is a single-seat agricultural biplane with tapered long-span wings, an enclosed single-seat cockpit and fixed tailwheel undercarriage. The prototype was fitted with a Jacobs R-755-B2 radial engine but later examples were fitted with other more modern powerplants.

Production was sub-contracted to Bellanca Aircraft of Alexandria, Minnesota. The type certificate was sold to Alexandria Aircraft LLC in 2002, but no further production has been undertaken.

Operational history

95 examples of the DW.1 were built between 1979 and 1983.  Their use has been predominantly in the agricultural aviation field as crop dusters and sprayers.  In 2001, over 40 examples remained in use throughout the United States.

Variants

Eagle 220   Continental W670-6N radial engine;
Eagle 300   Lycoming IO-540-M1B5D flat-six engine.

Specifications (Eagle 220)

References
Notes

Bibliography

1970s United States civil utility aircraft
1970s United States agricultural aircraft
Biplanes
Single-engined tractor aircraft
Aircraft first flown in 1977